The Other Woman is the first and only album released by Miss Jones. It was released on June 18, 1998 through Motown Records.

Jones had previously signed a deal with Tommy Boy Records and released the minor hits "Where I Wanna Be Boy" and "Don't Front", but left the label to take a job as a radio DJ for Hot 97. Eventually she returned to performing and signed with Motown and began to record her debut album. The project featured production from the likes of Mario Winans and Rashad Smith and guest appearances from Mobb Deep and Craig Mack.

The album's lead single was "2 Way Street", which managed to make it to the Billboard Hot 100, peaking at 62. The Other Woman, however, did not perform well and only made it to 51 on the Top R&B/Hip-Hop Albums. Jones was soon released from Motown and eventually left her music career behind in 2001.

Track listing

Charts

References

1998 debut albums
Motown albums